Punta Cardón is a town and parish in the Carirubana autonomous municipality of Falcón state, Venezuela.

The town was once a poor fishing community on the Gulf of Coro on the northwest coast of Venezuela.
Since the mid-1940s the community has become surrounded by the Paraguana- oil-refining complex, which today is run by PDVSA, the state oil company.
The Spanish architect José Lino Vaamonde built the Club Manaure in Punta Cardón (1953) for Shell Venezuela.

Notes

Sources

Cities in Falcón